The Riley–Cutler House is a historic residence located in Pedee, Oregon, United States. It was built in 1892 by David Riley, the owner of the local sash and planing mill in which the house's elaborate woodwork was made.  In 1979, it relocated from to Pedee from Dallas, Oregon. The house was listed on the National Register of Historic Places in 1980.

See also
National Register of Historic Places listings in Polk County, Oregon

References

Houses on the National Register of Historic Places in Oregon
Queen Anne architecture in Oregon
Houses completed in 1892
National Register of Historic Places in Polk County, Oregon
Houses in Polk County, Oregon
1892 establishments in Oregon
Relocated buildings and structures in Oregon